Brady Joe Lail (born August 9, 1993) is an American former professional baseball pitcher. He played in Major League Baseball (MLB) for the New York Yankees, Chicago White Sox and Seattle Mariners. He is currently the pitching development coach for the Jersey Shore BlueClaws in the Philadelphia Phillies organization.

Career

New York Yankees
Lail was drafted by the New York Yankees in the 18th round of the 2012 Major League Baseball draft out of Bingham High School in South Jordan, Utah. He signed with the Yankees and made his professional debut that season with the Gulf Coast Yankees where he was 1–0 with a 1.42 ERA in 12.2 innings pitched. He spent 2013 with the Gulf Coast Yankees and Tampa Yankees where he compiled a combined 5–1 record and 2.92 ERA in 14 games (12 starts) between the two teams, and 2014 with the Tampa and the Charleston RiverDogs where he was 11–5 with a 3.62 ERA in 25 total games (24 starts) between both clubs. In 2015, he played for Tampa, the Trenton Thunder, and the Scranton/Wilkes-Barre RailRiders where he was 10–6 with a 2.91 ERA in 28 games (27 starts), and in 2016, he pitched with the GCL Yankees, Trenton, and Scranton/Wilkes-Barre where he posted an 8–8 record and 4.62 ERA in 24 starts. Lail spent 2017 with Trenton and Scranton/Wilkes-Barre where he pitched to a 7–5 record and 4.90 ERA in 28 games (24 starts). He began 2018 with the RailRiders.

The Yankees invited Lail to spring training as a non-roster player in 2019.

On August 11, 2019, the Yankees selected Lail's contract and promoted him to the major leagues. He made his debut on August 12, allowing three runs over  innings pitched. He was optioned back to Triple-A Scranton/Wilkes-Barre the following day. On August 14, Lail was designated for assignment. He became a free agent following the 2019 season.

Chicago White Sox
On November 27, 2019, Lail signed a minor league deal with the Chicago White Sox. On August 4, 2020, Lail had his contract selected to the 40-man roster. He was designated for assignment on August 8.

Seattle Mariners
On August 10, 2020, Lail was claimed off waivers by the Seattle Mariners. After appearing in 7 games with the Mariners in 2020 with a 4.80 ERA, he was outrighted to Triple-A Tacoma. On October 19, it was announced that he elected free agency. On November 5, 2020, Lail re-signed a minor league deal with the Mariners. On May 17, 2021, Lail was selected to the active roster. Lail recorded a 13.50 ERA in 2 appearances before being designated for assignment on May 20.

Philadelphia Phillies
On May 23, 2021, Lail was claimed off waivers by the Philadelphia Phillies. On June 10, Lail was outrighted off of the 40-man roster and assigned to the Triple-A Lehigh Valley IronPigs without having appeared in a game for the Phillies. Lail made 13 appearances with Lehigh Valley, going 1–0 with a 6.08 ERA and 43 strikeouts. On October 13, Lail elected free agency.

High Point Rockers
On April 21, 2022, Lail signed with the High Point Rockers of the Atlantic League of Professional Baseball.

Toronto Blue Jays
On May 9, 2022, Lail signed a minor league deal with the Toronto Blue Jays organization. He played in 16 games split between the rookie-level Florida Complex League Blue Jays, Single-A Dunedin Blue Jays, and Double-A New Hampshire Fisher Cats, struggling to a cumulative 1-3 record and 7.00 ERA with 38 strikeouts in 36.0 innings pitched. He elected free agency on November 10, 2022.

Coaching career
On January 31, 2023, Lail was hired by the Philadelphia Phillies organization to serve as the pitching development coordinator their High-A affiliate, the Jersey Shore BlueClaws.

References

External links

1993 births
Living people
Águilas Cibaeñas players
American expatriate baseball players in the Dominican Republic
Baseball players from Utah
Charleston RiverDogs players
Chicago White Sox players
Gulf Coast Yankees players
Lehigh Valley IronPigs players
Major League Baseball pitchers
New York Yankees players
People from South Jordan, Utah
Scranton/Wilkes-Barre RailRiders players
Seattle Mariners players
Tacoma Rainiers players
Tampa Yankees players
Trenton Thunder players